Route 425 is a  long mostly west–east secondary highway in the northwest portion of New Brunswick, Canada. 

The route's Eastern terminus starts on Route 420 in Red Bank immediately crossing the Southwest Miramichi River to the north bank, passing Tozers Island. The road travels west passing through the community of Sunny Corner then the community of Boom Road, and Whitney.  The Road then Intersects with Route 435 before entering the community of Strathadam.  The route then passes by McKay Cove then the community of Eel Ground before entering community of Jones Crossing in the city of Miramichi at Route 8.

History

Intersecting routes
Route 435

References

425
425